Anaimelagaram  is a village in the Mayiladuthurai taluk of Mayiladuthurai district, Tamil Nadu, India.

Demographics 

 census, Anaimelagaram  had a total population of 2637 with 1260 males and 1377 females. The sex ratio was 1093. The literacy rate was 71.74.

References 

 

Villages in Mayiladuthurai district